Nguyễn Chấn, known as Trần Văn Trà (1918 – April 20, 1996) was a Vietnamese general. He was a commander in the Vietcong; a member of the Central Committee of the Lao Dong Party (Workers' Party of Vietnam) from 1960 to 1982; a lieutenant general in the army of the North Vietnam; chairman of Military Affairs Committee of the Central Office of South Vietnam (COSVN) (1964–1976).

Early life
The son of a bricklayer, Trần Văn Trà was born in Quảng Ngãi Province in 1918. He joined the Indochinese Communist Party in 1938 and spent the years of the Second World War in a French prison. Between 1946 and 1954, Trà fought against the French in the Vietnam People's Army and became a general in 1961, commanding communist forces in the southern half of South Vietnam. During the days of Indochina war with the French, the Viet Minh recruited more than 600 defeated Japanese soldiers to fight with them.

In June 1946, some of these Japanese followers became instructors in a military school set up by the Viet Minh in Quang Ngai Province, Trà's birthplace, to teach fighting skills to more than 400 Vietnamese trainees. It is not known if Trà was one of the organisers or attendees at this military training school. He was Commander of 7th Military Region (1949-1950) and Vice Commander of Cochinchina (1951-1954).

Vietnam War
During the Vietnam War against the Americans and South Vietnamese, he led the attack on Saigon during the Tet Offensive of 1968 and commanded the B-2 Front during the Easter Offensive. 

During a 1974 meeting of North Vietnamese military leaders in Hanoi, Trà argued against a conservative strategy during the coming year and suggested that South Vietnam's Phước Long Province be attacked in order to test both South Vietnamese and American military reaction. The attack was successful and the U.S. did not respond militarily, prompting larger, more aggressive communist operations. In April 1975, Trà became Deputy Commander of the A75 headquarters under Senior General Văn Tiến Dũng during the Ho Chi Minh Campaign, the final assault on Saigon which led to the capitulation of the South Vietnamese government. He was Vice-Minister of Defence from 1978 to 1982.

In 1982, Trà published Vietnam: A History of the Bulwark B-2 Theatre, Volume Concluding the 30-Years War, which revealed how the Hanoi Politburo had overestimated its own military capabilities and underestimated those of the U.S. and South Vietnam prior to and during the Tet Offensive. This account offended and embarrassed the leaders of the newly unified Socialist Republic of Vietnam and reportedly only one of the five volumes survived. It ultimately led to his purging from the Politburo.  From 1989 to 1992 he was Deputy Chairman of the Vietnam Veterans Association. He lived under something of a house arrest until his death on April 20, 1996.

References 

1918 births
1996 deaths
People from Quảng Ngãi province
Generals of the People's Army of Vietnam
North Vietnamese military personnel of the Vietnam War
Alternates of the 3rd Central Committee of the Workers' Party of Vietnam
Members of the 4th Central Committee of the Communist Party of Vietnam
Vietnamese nationalists